This is a list of villages and settlements in Edo State, Nigeria organized by local government area (LGA) and district/area (with postal codes also given). One of such villages is Ebueneki, which is situated in Ohuan ward in Uhunmwonde LGA.

By postal code
Below is a list of district/Area, including villages and schools, organised by postal code.

By electoral ward
Below is a list of polling units, including villages and schools, organised by electoral ward.

References

Edo